Iran participated in the 2006 Asian Games held in the city of Doha. This country is ranked 6th with 11 gold medals in this edition of the Asiad.

Competitors

Medal summary

Medal table

Medalists

Results by event

Aquatics

Swimming

Men

Water polo

Men

Athletics

Men

Women

Badminton

Women

Basketball

Men

Bodybuilding

Men

Boxing

Men

Canoeing

Men

Women

Chess

Men

Women

Mixed

Cycling

Road

Men

Track

Men

Equestrian

Jumping

Fencing

Men

Football

Men

Gymnastics

Artistic

Men

Handball

Men

Judo

Men

Kabaddi

Men

Karate

Men's kumite

Rowing

Men

Women

Sepak takraw

Men

Shooting

Men

Women

Taekwondo

Men

Women

Volleyball

Indoor

Men

Weightlifting

Men

Wrestling

Men's freestyle

Men's Greco-Roman

Wushu

Men's taolu

Men's sanda

References

External links
15th Asian Games – Doha 2006

Nations at the 2006 Asian Games
2006
Asian Games